The baldchin groper (Choerodon rubescens) is a species of wrasse endemic to Western Australia, where it occurs on coral and weed-grown rocky reefs.

References

baldchin groper
Marine fish of Western Australia 
Fauna of Western Australia 
Taxonomy articles created by Polbot
baldchin groper
baldchin groper